Maebh Long is an Irish academic with expertise on the modernist novelist and playwright Flann O'Brien. She is currently Senior Lecturer in the English Programme in the School of Arts at The University of Waikato in New Zealand, having been a Senior Lecturer and Deputy Head of School at the University of the South Pacific (USP) in Fiji.

Education and career
She obtained her BA in English and German (2001) and MA (with distinction) in English (2002) at University College Cork in Ireland and her PhD (2011) on "Derrida and a Theory of Irony: Parabasis and Parataxis" at the University of Durham in England.

Her research and teaching focus on modernist and contemporary literature from Ireland, Britain, and Oceania. She is also interested in Literary Theory, the History of Medicine, and Continental Philosophy. She has been influenced by Jacques Derrida and by Pacific Island literature.

Long has also written about the effect of climate change on sea level rise, particularly as it affects South Pacific island nations. In 2020 Long was granted funding by the Marsden Fund of New Zealand's Royal Society Te Apārangi to examine the ways modernist writers were influenced by metaphors of immunity. This research has strong connections to the COVID-19 pandemic.

Flann O'Brien
Long is an expert on the Irish novelist and playwright Flann O'Brien and has published two award winning books on him. She has significantly impacted wider recognition of O'Brien's work. Joseph Booker called The Collected Letters of Flann O'Brien, "a major event in the documentation of modern Ireland's history. The most significant publication by Brian O'Nolan since the belated arrival in print of The Third Policeman." The Irish Studies Review said, "Reading Maebh Long's recent book, Assembling Flann O'Brien, one cannot help thinking that the poor fellow is finally getting the attention he deserves." Assembling Flann O'Brien won the 2015 International Flann O'Brien Society's "Best book length study on a Brian O'Nolan theme"  In 2019 The Collected Letters of Flann O'Brien won the corresponding 2019 award.

Selected publications
 (2014) Assembling Flann O'Brien. London, New Delhi, New York: Bloomsbury, 2014. 
 (2018) "Introduction: Oceania in Theory", Symploke, 26(1-2), 9-18.
 (2018) "Vanua in the Anthropocene: Relationality and Sea Level Rise in Fiji", Symploke, 26(1-2), 51-70.
 (2018) "Girmit, postmemory, and Subramani", Pacific Dynamics, 2(2), 161-175.
 (2018) The Collected Letters of Flann O'Brien. Maebh Long (editor), Dalkey Archive. 
 (2020) New Oceania: Modernisms and Modernities in the Pacific. Matthew Hayward and Maebh Long (editors), New York and London: Routledge.

References

External links
 Home page
 Google Scholar Citations for Maebh Long

Academic staff of the University of Waikato
Academic staff of the University of the South Pacific
Living people
Irish scholars and academics
Alumni of the National University of Ireland
Alumni of Durham University
Year of birth missing (living people)
Recipients of Marsden grants